In the Bible, a scapegoat is one of a pair of kid goats that is released into the wilderness, taking with it all sins and impurities, while the other is sacrificed. The concept first appears in the Book of Leviticus, in which a goat is designated to be cast into the desert to carry away the sins of the community.

Practices with some similarities to the scapegoat ritual also appear in Ancient Greece and Ebla.

Origins
Some scholars have argued that the scapegoat ritual can be traced back to Ebla around 2400 BC, from where it spread throughout the ancient Near East.

Etymology

The word "scapegoat" is an English translation of the Hebrew , which occurs in Leviticus 16:8:

The Brown–Driver–Briggs Hebrew Lexicon gives  as a reduplicative intensive of the stem , "remove", hence , "for entire removal". This reading is supported by the Greek Old Testament translation as "the sender away (of sins)". The lexicographer Gesenius takes  to mean "averter", which he theorized was the name of a deity, to be appeased with the sacrifice of the goat.

Alternatively, broadly contemporary with the Septuagint, the pseudepigraphical Book of Enoch may preserve Azazel as the name of a fallen angel.

 
Early English Christian Bible versions follow the translation of the Septuagint and Latin Vulgate, which interpret  as "the goat that departs" (Greek , "goat sent out", Latin , "emissary goat"). William Tyndale rendered the Latin as "(e)scape goat" in his 1530 Bible. This translation was followed by subsequent versions up through the King James Version of the Bible in 1611: "And Aaron shall cast lots upon the two goats; one lot for the Lord, and the other lot for the scapegoat." Several modern versions however either leave it as the proper noun Azazel, or footnote "for Azazel" as an alternative reading.

From the Targums onwards the term  was also seen by some rabbinical commentators as the name of a Hebrew demon, angelic force, or pagan deity. The two readings are still disputed today.

Ancient Judaism

The scapegoat was a goat that was designated ; "for absolute removal" (for symbolic removal of the people's sins with the literal removal of the goat), and outcast in the desert as part of the ceremonies of the Day of Atonement, that began during the Exodus with the original Tabernacle and continued through the times of the temples in Jerusalem.

Once a year, on Yom Kippur, the Cohen Gadol sacrificed a bull as a sin offering to atone for sins he may have committed unintentionally throughout the year. Subsequently he took two goats and presented them at the door of the tabernacle. Two goats were chosen by lot: one to be "for YHWH", which was offered as a blood sacrifice, and the other to be the scapegoat to be sent away into the wilderness and pushed down a steep ravine where it died. The blood of the slain goat was taken into the Holy of Holies behind the sacred veil and sprinkled on the mercy seat, the lid of the ark of the covenant. Later in the ceremonies of the day, the High Priest confessed the intentional sins of the Israelites to God placing them figuratively on the head of the other goat, the Azazel scapegoat, who would symbolically "take them away".

Christian perspectives 

In Christianity, this process prefigures the sacrifice of Christ on the cross through which God has been propitiated and sins can be expiated. Jesus Christ is seen to have fulfilled all of the biblical "types"—the High Priest who officiates at the ceremony, the Lord's goat that deals with the pollution of sin and the scapegoat that removes the "burden of sin". Christians believe that sinners who admit their guilt and confess their sins, exercising faith and trust in the person and sacrifice of Jesus, are forgiven of their sins. The sacrifice of these two goats foretells to a degree of what happened when Jesus and Barabbas were presented by Pontius Pilate to the people in Jerusalem. Barabbas (which means son of the father in Aramaic) who was guilty (burdened with sin) was released while Jesus (also the Son of the Father) who was innocent of Sin was presented by the High Priest and was sacrificed by the Romans through crucifixion.

Since the second goat was sent away to perish, the word "scapegoat" has developed to indicate a person who is blamed and punished for the actions of others.

Similar practices

Ancient Syria
A concept superficially similar to the biblical scapegoat is attested in two ritual texts of the 24th century BC archived at Ebla. They were connected with ritual purification on the occasion of the king's wedding. In them, a she-goat with a silver bracelet hung from her neck was driven forth into the wasteland of "Alini"; "we" in the report of the ritual involves the whole community. Such "elimination rites", in which an animal, without confession of sins, is the vehicle of evils (not sins) that are chased from the community are widely attested in the Ancient Near East.

Ancient Greece
Ancient Greeks practiced scapegoating rituals in exceptional times based on the belief that the repudiation of one or two individuals would save the whole community. Scapegoating was practiced with different rituals across ancient Greece for different reasons but was mainly used during extraordinary circumstances such as famine, drought, or plague.

There is a dichotomy, however, in the individuals used as scapegoats in mythical tales and the ones used in the actual rituals. In mythical tales, it was stressed that someone of high importance had to be sacrificed if the whole society were to benefit from the aversion of catastrophe (usually a king or the king's children). However, since no king or person of importance would be willing to sacrifice himself or his children, the scapegoat in actual rituals would be someone of lower society who would be given value through special treatment such as fine clothes and dining before the sacrificial ceremony.

Sacrificial ceremonies varied across Greece depending on the festival and type of catastrophe. In Abdera, for example, a poor man was feasted and led around the walls of the city once before being chased out with stones. In Massilia, a poor man was feasted for a year and then cast out of the city in order to stop a plague. The scholia refer to the  being killed, but many scholars reject this and argue that the earliest evidence (the fragments of the iambic satirist Hipponax) show the  being only stoned, beaten, and driven from the community.

In literature

The scapegoat, as a religious and ritualistic practice and a metaphor for social exclusion, is one of the major preoccupations in Dimitris Lyacos's Poena Damni trilogy. In the first book, Z213: Exit, the narrator sets out on a voyage in the midst of a dystopian landscape that is reminiscent of the desert mentioned in Leviticus (16, 22). The text also contains references to the ancient Greek . In the second book, With the People from the Bridge, the male and female characters are treated apotropaically as vampires and are cast out from both the world of the living and that of the dead. In the third book, The First Death, the main character appears irrevocably marooned on a desert island as a personification of miasma expelled to a geographical point of no return.

See also
Dosmoche – "The Festival of the Scapegoat" (Tibetan Buddhism)
Frameup
Purge
Sin-eater
Whipping boy

References

External links

Persecution
Jewish animal sacrifice
Hebrew Bible words and phrases
Yom Kippur
Book of Leviticus
Metaphors referring to sheep or goats
Goats
Animals in the Bible
Majority–minority relations